South Carolina Highway 363 (SC 363) is a  state highway in the U.S. state of South Carolina. The highway is designated on an east–west direction, from U.S. Route 321 (US 321) in Luray to SC 63 just outside Varnville.

Route description

History

Major intersections

See also

References

External links

SC 363 at Virginia Highways' South Carolina Highways Annex

363
Transportation in Hampton County, South Carolina